Pareiorhaphis azygolechis is a species of catfish in the family Loricariidae. It is native to South America, where it occurs in the São João River basin, with its type locality being given as 8 km (5 mi) north of Garuva in the state of Paraná in Brazil. The species reaches 11.7 cm (4.6 inches) in standard length and is believed to be a facultative air-breather.

References 

Loricariidae
Fish described in 2002
Catfish of South America